William Phineus Winneshiek, also spelled Winneshick and referred to as NahiSonwahika (December 24, 1892 – September 15, 1949), was a professional football player who played in the National Football League during the 1922 season, at age 25. That season, he joined the NFL's Oorang Indians. The Indians were a team based in LaRue, Ohio, composed only of Native Americans, and coached by Jim Thorpe. Bill was a member of the Ho-Chunk or Winnebago tribe.

His father helped him to attend Carlisle Indian School in Pennsylvania from 1911-1915.  He found friendship with Jim Thorpe and found his love for football.  In addition to playing with the NFL, Bill was an Assistant Football Coach at Lebanon Valley College , a professional musician in Chief Winneshiek's All Indian Band, and traveled to the Antarctic with Admiral Byrd. He later married Marie Marguerite Zerbe, an elementary school teacher and local physician's daughter. The two had a son, named William Sherwood Winneshiek, who would later fly 49 B-17 missions over Germany during World War II and culminating his military as Director of Communications at NORAD in Colorado Springs, CO. They also had a daughter, Doris Winona Winneshiek who became a nurse and writer.

References

External links

Uniform Numbers of the NFL
http://hocak-nation.com/phineus.html

1890s births
1949 deaths
Native American sportspeople
Players of American football from Wisconsin
Carlisle Indians football players
Carlisle Indian Industrial School alumni
Oorang Indians players